Cocoşeşti may refer to several villages in Romania:

 Cocoşeşti, a village in Avram Iancu, Alba
 Cocoşeşti, a village in Păulești, Prahova

See also
 Cocoș River (disambiguation)
 Cocoșul River (disambiguation)